State Route 93 (SR 93) is a  state highway in the eastern part of the U.S. state of Tennessee. It begins at US 11E/US 321 in Greeneville and ending at the Tennessee–Virginia state line in Bloomingdale, Tennessee.

Route description
SR 93 begins at an intersection with US 11E/US 321 in Greeneville. It then heads northeast toward Kingsport. The route intersects SR 81 just south of Fall Branch and heads more northerly. In Fall Branch, it has an interchange with I-81 exit 50 and continues north to Kingsport where it intersects SR 347 just south of there. In Kingsport, it has an interchange with I-26 and SR 126 for the first time. This also marks the western terminus of SR 126. The route heads east as a controlled-access southern bypass of the city passing by Eastman Chemical Company and crossing over the South Fork Holston River and has an interchange with SR 36. Then, it intersects SR 126 for a second time at an interchange. SR 93 then turns back north to an interchange with US 11W and then it meets its northern terminus, at the Tennessee–Virginia State Line in Bloomingdale.

All of SR 93, from just north of I-81 to US 11W, is included as part of the National Highway System, a system of roadways important to the nation's economy, defense, and mobility.

Junction list

See also

References

093
Transportation in Greene County, Tennessee
Transportation in Sullivan County, Tennessee
Transportation in Washington County, Tennessee
Greeneville, Tennessee
Kingsport, Tennessee
Freeways in Tennessee